The Coupe de France 1998–99 was its 82nd edition. It was won by FC Nantes Atlantique which defeated CS Sedan Ardennes in the Final.

Round of 16

Quarter-finals

Semi-finals

Final

Topscorer
Dagui Bakari (5 goals)
Olivier Quint (5 goals)

References

French federation
1998–99 Coupe de France at ScoreShelf.com

1998–99 domestic association football cups
1998–99 in French football
1998-99